Arthur George Paul (24 July 1864 – 14 January 1942) was an Irish sportsman who played rugby union as a full back, playing club rugby for Swinton and represented Lancashire as a first-class cricketer. Paul was not selected for the England or Ireland rugby teams, but in 1888 he was chosen for the New Zealand and Australia tour as part of the first British Isles team.

Rugby career
In 1888, Paul was invited to join the first British rugby overseas tour. The tour was managed by two cricketers, Arthur Shrewsbury and Alfred Shaw, but it was not supported by any of the rugby unions and no matches were arranged with national teams. The tour took in both Australia and New Zealand and 35 rugby matches were played against invitational teams. Paul was selected to play at full back, and took part in 29 matches, kicking 13 conversions and one dropped goal.

Bibliography

References

External links
Search for "Paul" at espn.co.uk (1888 British Isles tourists statistics missing (31 December 2017))

1864 births
1942 deaths
British & Irish Lions rugby union players from Ireland
Irish cricketers
Irish rugby union players
Lancashire cricketers
Cricketers from Belfast
Rugby union fullbacks
Swinton Lions players
North v South cricketers
Cricketers from Northern Ireland
Rugby union players from Belfast